The 1983–84  Liga Leumit season began on 24 September 1983 and ended on 26 May 1984, with Maccabi Haifa winning their first ever title. David Lavi of Maccabi Netanya was the league's top scorer with 17 goals.

Bnei Yehuda, Maccabi Ramat Amidar and Hapoel Yehud were all relegated to Liga Artzit.

Final table

Results

References
Israel - List of Final Tables RSSSF

 

Liga Leumit seasons
Israel
1